Sathmar Swabian (endonym: Schwǫbisch) is an Upper Swabian dialect of High German spoken in Romania in Satu Mare and Satu Mare County, north-western Transylvania by the Sathmar Swabians, who are among the few Danube Swabians who are in fact truly Swabian in origin. Many speakers now live in Germany but some remain in northwestern Transylvania, Romania, more specifically in Satu Mare County.

Sample words

References

External links 

 PDF on varieties of German

Swabian German language
Ethnic German groups in Romania
German dialects
Languages of Romania
City colloquials
Culture in Satu Mare